The Randall Fawcett House is a Frank Lloyd Wright–designed Usonian home in Los Banos, California. The home was designed in 1955 and completed in 1961.

The original owners, Randall "Buck" and Harriet Fawcett, met Wright while taking an architecture course at Stanford University. Buck Fawcett was a star college football player, selected by the Chicago Bears in the 1944 NFL Draft. Instead, he returned to work the Los Banos farm that his father had homesteaded, after the patriarch became seriously ill with valley fever.

The couple's daughter Lynn and her husband, Henry Whiting II (an architectural writer), live in the Wright-designed Archie Boyd Teater Studio in Bliss, Idaho.

The Fawcett House is one of three Usonians in California's central valley (along with the Dr. George Ablin House in Bakersfield and the Robert G. Walton House in Modesto), with this one being in the most unlikely of locationsfarm and dairy land well beyond the outskirts of Santa Nella better known for Andersen's Pea Soup Restaurant nearby on Interstate 5 than as a mecca of modern architecture.

Constructed of battered (sloped) concrete block, the plan is a sort of "H" or "K" plan with wings at 60/120-degree angles. The yard is landscaped with a Koi pond and swimming pool.

The house has a shallow, circular flower planter, more commonly found in Wright designs of 50 years before, on top of one of the walls near the entrance. The hearth's 12-foot-wide fireplace rises tall and grand to the left of the entrance. Living spaces incorporate five bedrooms, 4.5 baths, open-plan living room, dining room, a kitchen formalized by ornamental screens, a utility-store room and central laundry.

References

Sources
 Storrer, William Allin. The Frank Lloyd Wright Companion. University Of Chicago Press, 2006,  (S.385)

External links
 Official Frank Lloyd Wright Fawcett House website

Frank Lloyd Wright buildings
Los Banos, California
Houses in Merced County, California
Houses completed in 1961
1960s architecture in the United States
Modernist architecture in California